Lallu Lal (1763–1835) was an academic, author and translator from British India. He was an instructor in the Hindustani language at Fort William College in Hastings, Calcutta. He is notable for Prem Sagar, the first work in modern literary Hindi.

Biography 

Lallu Lal was born into a Gujarati Sahsra Audichya Brahmin family from Agra. He had knowledge of Persian and Hindustani. He came to Murshidabad, Bengal, to earn a living, and served the Nawab of Murshidabad for seven years. He was noticed by John Gilchrist, who brought him to the Fort William College in Calcutta. There, Lallu Lal translated and authored several literary works into modern vernacular Hindi. He retired from the Fort William College in 1823–24 CE, after serving there for 24 years.

Works 

Lallu Lal's most notable translation is Prem Sagar (1804–1810), the earliest prose in Khari Boli dialect of Hindi. Along with Kazim Ali Javan, he translated Singhasan Battisi and Shakuntala into Hindustani. Along with Mazhar Ali Vila, he also translated Baital Pachisi and Madhunal (1805) into Hindustani.

Lallu Lal's original work included The Grammar of Brij-bhasa (1811), in Urdu script. He also authored Lala Chandrika, a commentary on Bihari's Satasai.

In addition, he compiled Lataif-i-Hindi or The New Cyclopedia Hindoostanica of Wit (1810) in Urdu and Devanagari scripts. It is a collection of around 100 witty stories and anecdotes.

Prem Sagar 
Prem Sagar or Prem Sagur ("Ocean of Love") was one of the first modern Hindi books that was typeset and published, composed between 1804 and 1810, and published in 1810. A translation of Chaturbhuja Misra's Braj Bhasa book, its story is based on the tenth book of the Bhagavata Purana, the legend of Krishna. Lallo Lal mention that book has been composed in the "Khadi Boli of Delhi-Agra". The language is termed as "translated into Hinduvee from the Brij Bhasha" on the face page.

The earliest Hindustani language literature made heavy use of Persian words, and resembled modern Urdu. Lallu Lal was among the first writers to use words of Indo-Aryan origin in Hindustani language literature. His Prem Sagar is the earliest work, whose language resembles modern Sanskritized Hindi. Linguist Jules Bloch describes the importance of Lallu Lal's work as follows:

References

Bibliography 
 The Prema-Sâgara or, Ocean of Love. Ed. by Frederick Pincoff. Westminster, Archibald Constable, 1891
 Théologie hindoue. Le Prem Sagar, océan d’amour. Traduit par Е. Lamairesse II., 1893, Saint-Amand, 1899
 The Prem Sagar in English. Allahabad, 1900

External links 

 The Prem Sagur of Lallu Lal
 The Prem Sagur of Lallu Lal, translated into English by W. Hollings (1848)
 Lullov-Lal, The Prem Sagur or the history of Krishnu, according to tho tenth chapter of the Bhaguvut of Vyasudevu, transl. into Hindu from the Bruj Bhasha etc. Calcutta, 1842

Hindi-language writers
Gujarati people
People from Agra
1763 births
1835 deaths
19th-century Indian male writers
18th-century Indian translators
19th-century Indian translators